Top Gear is a Chinese television series about motor vehicles, primarily on cars, and is an adaptation of the British television series Top Gear. The show premiered on 13 November 2014 on the network Shanghai Dragon TV. Series 1 was hosted by Cheng Lei, Richie Jen, and Tian Liang, Series 2 by Cheng Lei, Ma Dong, and Ou Han-sheng. The show also features a segment similar to Star in a Reasonably Priced Car (Ford Focus in Series 1 and Volkswagen Lamando in Series 2) and a Chinese Stig, whose identity is currently unknown.

Episodes

History
The first attempt at a Chinese Top Gear was in 2011.

In May 2014, BBC announced that it has signed a deal with Honyee Media to produce a local version of Top Gear in China. On 13 November 2014, the first series of the Top Gear China premiered on Shanghai Dragon Television, presented by Cheng Lei, a veteran Chinese TV presenter, Richie Jen, a Taiwanese singer and actor, and Tian Liang, a former Olympic gold-medalist in diving.

Production started in July 2014. Filming took place in various locations, such as: Inner Mongolia, Xinjiang, Chongqing, Guizhou, Shanghai, Beijing, and Wuxi.

Reception
Season 2 has had a total audience of 217 million with 5 episodes.

References

External links

2014 Chinese television series debuts
2015 Chinese television series endings
Chinese reality television series
Chinese television series based on British television series
Dragon Television original programming
China